Lasiodiplodia margaritacea is an endophytic fungus that might be a canker pathogen, specifically for Adansonia gibbosa (baobab). It was isolated from said trees, as well as surrounding ones, in the Kimberley (Western Australia).

References

Further reading
Van der Linde, Johannes Alwyn, et al. "Lasiodiplodia species associated with dying Euphorbia ingens in South Africa." Southern Forests: a Journal of Forest Science 73.3-4 (2011): 165–173.
Machado, Alexandre Reis, Danilo Batista Pinho, and Olinto Liparini Pereira. "Phylogeny, identification and pathogenicity of the Botryosphaeriaceae associated with collar and root rot of the biofuel plant Jatropha curcas in Brazil, with a description of new species of Lasiodiplodia." Fungal Diversity 67.1 (2014): 231–247.
Australia, Western. Draginja Pavlic. Diss. University of Pretoria, 2009.

External links
MycoBank

Botryosphaeriaceae
Fungi described in 2008